Carrapateira is a village in Vila Real de Santo António Municipality, Algarve, Portugal. It is located to the northwest of Ayamonte.

References

Villages in the Algarve